Bayneville is an unincorporated community in Ohio Township, Sedgwick County, Kansas, United States.  It is located on S 87th W between W 71st S and W 79st S.

History
Bayneville had its start by the building of the Missouri Pacific Railroad through that territory. It was named for Judge Bayne, a railroad promoter.

A post office was opened in Bayneville in 1884, and remained in operation until it was discontinued in 1934.

Education
The community is served by Clearwater USD 264 public school district.

References

Further reading

External links
 Sedgwick County maps: Current, Historic, KDOT

Unincorporated communities in Sedgwick County, Kansas
Unincorporated communities in Kansas